Boreotrophon candelabrum is a species of sea snail, a marine gastropod mollusk in the family Muricidae, the murex snails or rock snails.

Description

Distribution

Behavior
B. candelabrum have been known to attack and eat sea scallops by drilling into them.

References

Gastropods described in 1848
Boreotrophon